Gwendoline Jean Plumb AM BEM (2 August 1912 – 5 June 2002), was an Australian performer of international appeal, actress and comedian active in literally every form of the art genre, (except circus) including revue, pantomime, vaudeville, interviewing, stage, radio, game shows, live appearances, television soap opera and mini-series and made-for-TV film.

She was considered the Grand Dame of Australian entertainment, best known to local and international audiences in serial The Young Doctors as gossip Ada Simmonds, the ill-fated Richmond Hill as Mum Foote and the pilot of Home and Away as Doris Peters.

Career
Gwen started her career in 1930, with the Gwen Meredith drama club, she had her first well-known role as Emmie in the longest-running Australian radio serial Blue Hills, and hosted a radio program on Australia's Macquarie Radio Network from 1945 to 1974. She also had a radio show in Sydney opposite Gordon Chater. She was well known for her celebrity interviews, including travelling to Europe to conduct recordings.

Plumb had a long career in the theatre, was a cast member of the debut season of the Old Tote Theatre Company, travelled extensively overseas to interview celebrities for her own radio programme, and once quipped that she "played in just about every form of public entertainment except the circus".

She is probably best remembered for the Australian soap opera The Young Doctors as Ada Simmonds for its entire November 1976 – March 1983 run. She released a cook book, What's Cooking with Ada, under her characters name in 1980. Other notable roles were in the mini-series The Harp in the South and Poor Man's Orange in the mid-1980s. She acted in Neighbours as Mrs. Forbes in 1985, appearing in scenes opposite Alan Dale, with whom she had starred in The Young Doctors.

She later played the key role of in the serial Richmond Hill as Mum Foote in 1988. Having agreed to act in the planned new series, Plumb was offered, and played in the pilot of another proposed series Home and Away as Doris Peters. When Home and Away also went into production, Plumb opted to honour her earlier agreement to do Richmond Hill. The role of Mum Foote had been specially written with her in mind by show creator, Reg Watson. Richmond Hill had a run of just 12 months, and Plumb stayed with the series for all of that time; Home and Away on the other hand is still running today. In 1995 Plumb returned to Home and Away for a number of episodes, playing a different character.

Plumb also appeared in the mini-series Stark, based on Ben Elton's novel of the same name.

Personal life 
Plumb's lifelong partner was Australian radio, stage and screen actress Thelma Scott, best known for serial Number 96 as pompous socialite Clair Houghton.

Plumb wrote her autobiography, Plumb Crazy which was published by Pan Macmillan in 1994.

British and Australian honours 
Plumb was awarded a British Empire Medal in 1973, and was made a Member of the Order of Australia in 1993. Both awards recognised her community and charity work.

Selected Radio

Filmography

Film

Television

Selected Role

References

External links

1912 births
2002 deaths
Australian television actresses
Australian stage actresses
Members of the Order of Australia
Australian recipients of the British Empire Medal
Australian LGBT actors
Former 2GB presenters
Australian radio presenters
Australian women radio presenters
20th-century LGBT people